Eric Sardinas (born November 10, 1970) is an American blues-rock slide guitarist born in Fort Lauderdale, Florida.  He is noted for his use of the electric resonator guitar and his live performances. He sometimes sets his guitar alight on stage and during shows.  In 2000 in Sydney, Sardinas suffered third degree burns to his left wrist.

Sardinas began to play the guitar at age six and leaned toward vintage recordings by such Delta bluesmen as Charlie Patton, Bukka White, Big Bill Broonzy, Elmore James, and Muddy Waters.  Although he was left-handed, he eventually started to play right-handed.

In 2002, he was featured on the Bo Diddley tribute album Hey Bo Diddley - A Tribute!, performing the song "Ride On Josephine".

He signed to Steve Vai's Favored Nations record label and was the opening act for Vai's The Real Illusions Tour 2005 around the world.

In 2008, Sardinas released Eric Sardinas and Big Motor on Favored Nations in the U.S.

Discography 
Albums (except where stated)
 Treat Me Right (1999)
 Angel Face (2000 EP)
 Devil's Train (2001)
 Black Pearls (2003)
 Eric Sardinas and Big Motor (2008)
 Sticks & Stones (2011)
 Boomerang (2014)

See also 
 Kenny Wayne Shepherd
 Johnny Winter

References

External links
 Official Eric Sardinas Website
 Favored Nations Official Site
 Eric Sardinas UK Fan Site

American blues singers
American blues guitarists
American male guitarists
Slide guitarists
Electric blues musicians
1970 births
Living people
21st-century American male singers
21st-century American singers
21st-century American guitarists
Favored Nations artists
Provogue Records artists